Easton is a city in Leavenworth County, Kansas, United States, and part of the Kansas City metropolitan area.  As of the 2020 census, the population of the city was 213.

History
Easton was originally known as Eastin, and under the latter name was laid out in 1854 by General Eastin J. Trader . Later, at the insistence of Governor Andrew Horatio Reeder, the name was changed to Easton for Reeder's birthplace of Easton, Pennsylvania.

The first post office in Easton was established in December 1855.

Geography
Easton is located at  (39.344400, −95.116524).

Climate
The climate in this area is characterized by hot, humid summers and generally mild to cool winters.  According to the Köppen Climate Classification system, Easton has a humid subtropical climate, abbreviated "Cfa" on climate maps.

Demographics

2010 census
As of the census of 2010, there were 253 people, 81 households, and 55 families residing in the city. The racial makeup of the city was 98.8% White, 0.4% African American, and 0.8% from two or more races. Hispanic or Latino of any race were 1.2% of the population.

There were 81 households, of which 32.1% had children under the age of 18 living with them, 51.9% were married couples living together, 12.3% had a female householder with no husband present, 3.7% had a male householder with no wife present, and 32.1% were non-families. Of all households 25.9% were made up of individuals, and 11.1% had someone living alone who was 65 years of age or older. The average household size was 2.57 and the average family size was 3.09.

The median age in the city was 41.9 years. Of residents 20.6% were under the age of 18; 9% were between the ages of 18 and 24; 25.3% were from 25 to 44; 17.4% were from 45 to 64; and 27.7% were 65 years of age or older. The gender makeup of the city was 46.6% male and 53.4% female.

2000 census
As of the census of 2000, there were 362 people, 117 households, and 87 families residing in the city. The racial makeup of the city was 94% White, 1% African American, 1% Native American, <1% Asian, 1% from other races, and 2% from two or more races. Hispanic or Latino of any race were 2% of the population.

There were 117 households, out of which 44% had children under the age of 18 living with them, 55% were married couples living together, 12% had a female householder with no husband present, and 25% were non-families. Of all households 22% were made up of individuals, and 6% had someone living alone who was 65 years of age or older. The average household size was 2.7 and the average family size was 3.2.

In the city, the population was spread out, with 32% under the age of 18, 9% from 18 to 24, 25% from 25 to 44, 13% from 45 to 64, and 22% who were 65 years of age or older. The median age was 32 years. For every 100 females, there were 97.8 males. For every 100 females age 18 and over, there were 90.8 males.

The median income for a household in the city was $26,818, and the median income for a family was $29,000. Males had a median income of $26,625 versus $19,375 for females. The per capita income for the city was $12,751. About 22% of families and 18% of the population were below the poverty line, including 24% of those under age 18 and 5% of those age 65 or over.

Education
Easton is a part of USD 449 Easton. Pleasant Ridge High School is the district high school. The Pleasant Ridge High School mascot is Rams.

Easton High School was closed due to school unification. The Easton High School mascot was Easton Dragons.

References

Further reading

External links
 Easton - Directory of Public Officials
 Easton city map, KDOT

Cities in Kansas
Cities in Leavenworth County, Kansas